Eigirdžiai (Samogitian: Eigėrdē) is a town in Telšiai County, Lithuania. According to the 2011 census, the town had a population of 630 people.

References

Towns in Lithuania
Towns in Telšiai County
Telšiai District Municipality